Supernatural is an EP by American alternative rock band Alien Crime Syndicate and was released in 1999. There were two editions of the record available, a 7" Vinyl and a CD release, both with alternative track listings.

Track listing

Personnel

Alien Crime Syndicate
Joe Reineke – vocals, guitar
Jeff Rouse – bass, vocals
Nabil Ayers – drums

References

1999 EPs
Alien Crime Syndicate albums